Fukave is an island in Tonga, off the coast of Tongatapu.

References 

Islands of Tonga